Ringo is an unincorporated community in Crawford County, Kansas, United States.  As of the 2020 census, the population of the community and nearby areas was 111.

History
A post office was opened in Ringo in 1915, and remained in operation until it was discontinued in 1957.

Demographics

For statistical purposes, the United States Census Bureau has defined Ringo as a census-designated place (CDP).

References

Further reading

External links
 Crawford County maps: Current, Historic, KDOT

Unincorporated communities in Crawford County, Kansas
Unincorporated communities in Kansas